South Carolina Highway 151 Business may refer to:

South Carolina Highway 151 Business (Hartsville), a business loop in Hartsville
South Carolina Highway 151 Business (Jefferson), a business loop in Jefferson
South Carolina Highway 151 Business (Pageland), a business loop in Pageland

151 Business
151 Business